The Kelowna Double Cash is an annual tournament on the men's and women's World Curling Tour. It is held annually in November at the Kelowna Curling Club in Kelowna, British Columbia. The men's event is sponsored by Raymond James Financial and the women's event by the Sunset Ranch Golf & Country Club.

The purse for the event is $15,200.

The event has been held since 2018.

The 2020 event was the first BC event of the 2020–21 curling season, as other events had been cancelled due to the COVID-19 pandemic in British Columbia.

Men's champions

Women's champions

References

Women's World Curling Tour events
World Curling Tour events
Sport in Kelowna
Curling in British Columbia